Lucius Calpurnius Piso Caesoninus is a name used by several men of the gens Calpurnia during the Roman Republic, including:

Lucius Calpurnius Piso Caesoninus (consul 148 BC)
Lucius Calpurnius Piso Caesoninus (consul 112 BC)
Lucius Calpurnius Piso Caesoninus (consul 58 BC)
Lucius Calpurnius Piso Caesoninus (consul 15 BC), pontifex

See also
 Lucius Calpurnius Piso (disambiguation)
 Calpurnii Pisones